Yinchuan Hedong International Airport  is the primary airport serving Yinchuan, the capital of Ningxia Hui Autonomous Region, People's Republic of China. A relatively small airport compared to many airports in China, it nevertheless is the autonomous region's main aviation gateway. Its name "Hedong" literally means "East of the River" and derives from the airport's location east of the Yellow River. It is connected to over 20 cities by either direct flights, or transferring in Xi'an and Beijing. The airport handled 10,575,393 passengers in 2019, making it the 38th busiest airport in China.

History 
Hedong Airport was constructed after Yinchuan Xihuayuan Airport became constrained to expand and modernize. The first test flight was on  21 August 1997, and the airport was officially opened on 6 September that same year. 

In 2013, the airport handled 4,247,843 passengers, in 2017, the airport handled 67,079 flights, almost 8 million passengers and 40,000 tons of cargo.

Airlines and destinations

Passenger

Ground transportation
Hedong Airport railway station was opened in 2019.

See also
List of airports in China

References

External links
Official website

Airports in Ningxia
Yinchuan
Airports established in 1997
1997 establishments in China